Giosuè Alessandro Giuseppe Carducci (27 July 1835 – 16 February 1907) was an Italian poet, writer, literary critic and teacher. He was very noticeably influential, and was regarded as the official national poet of modern Italy. In 1906, he became the first Italian to receive the Nobel Prize in Literature. The Swedish Academy's motivation was that "not only in consideration of his deep learning and critical research, but above all as a tribute to the creative energy, freshness of style, and lyrical force which characterize his poetic masterpieces."

Biography

He was born in Valdicastello (part of Pietrasanta), a small town in the Province of Lucca in the northwest corner of the region of Tuscany. His father, a doctor, was an advocate of the unification of Italy and was involved with the Carbonari. Because of his politics, the family was forced to move several times during Carducci's childhood, eventually settling for a few years in Florence.

From the time he was in school, he was fascinated with the restrained style of Greek and Roman Antiquity, and his mature work reflects a restrained classical style, often using the classical meters of such Latin poets as Horace and Virgil. He translated Book 9 of Homer's Iliad into Italian.

Carducci was awarded a scholarship to study at the prestigious Scuola Normale Superiore di Pisa. After graduating in 1856, he began teaching school. The following year, he published his first collection of poems, Rime. These were difficult years for Carducci: his father died, and his brother committed suicide.

In 1859, he married Elvira Menicucci, and they had four children. He briefly taught Greek at a high school in Pistoia, and then was appointed Professor of Italian Literature at the University of Bologna. Here, one of his students was Giovanni Pascoli, who became an eminent poet himself and later succeeded him at the university.

Carducci was a popular lecturer and a fierce critic of literature and society. In his youth he was an atheist, whose political views were vehemently hostile to the Catholic Church. In the course of his life his views on religion shifted towards a socially oriented theism which he exposed in his famous "Discorso sulla libertà perpetua di San Marino" ("A Speech on San Marino's Perpetual Freedom"), pronounced on September the 30th, 1894 before the authorities and people of that ancient Republic and celebrating "the Universal God of Peoples, Mazzini's and Washington's God".

His anti-clerical revolutionary vehemence was prominently showcased in one famous poem, the deliberately blasphemous and provocative "Inno a Satana" ("Hymn to Satan"). "Satan" / "Lucifer" was considered by Italian leftists of the time as a metaphor of the rebellious and freethinking spirit. The poem was composed in 1863 as a dinner party toast, published in 1865, then republished in 1869 by Bologna's radical newspaper, Il Popolo, as a provocation timed to coincide with the First Vatican Council, a time when revolutionary fervor directed against the papacy was running high as republicans pressed both politically and militarily for an end to the Vatican's domination over the papal states.

While "Inno a Satana" had quite a revolutionary impact, Carducci's finest poetry came in later years. His collections Rime Nuove (New Rhymes) and Odi Barbare (Barbarian Odes) contain his greatest works.

He was the first Italian to receive the Nobel Prize in Literature, in 1906. He was also appointed senator by the King of Italy (1890). In politics he remained a strong Liberal throughout his life; through the years he progressively evolved from republicanism to a sort of support to monarchy. He was a Freemason. Although his reputation rests primarily on his poetry, he also produced a large body of prose works. Indeed, his prose writings, including literary criticism, biographies, speeches and essays, fill some 20 volumes. Carducci was also an excellent translator and translated some of Goethe and Heine into Italian.

The Museum of the Risorgimento, Bologna is housed in the Casa Carducci, the house where he died at the age of 71, and contains an exhibit on the author.

Legacy
Carducci confessed his sins and was reconciled to the Catholic Church in 1895. On 11 September 1978, Pope John Paul I mentioned him as a "model" for university professors and teachers of Latin.

Works
It is not always easy to follow the development of Carducci's poetry through the collections he edited. The poet in fact organized his compositions several times and in different ways and gave a definitive arrangement only later in the edition of his Opere published for Zanichelli between 1889 and 1909. The following is a list of poetic works published in one volume, then rearranged into the 20 volumes of his Opere.

 Rime, San Miniato, 1857.
 Levia Gravia, 1868.
 Poesie, Firenze, Barbera, 1871.
 Primavere elleniche, 1872.
 Nuove poesie, 1873.
 Odi barbare, 1877.
 Juvenilia, 1880.
 Levia Gravia, 1881.
 Giambi ed Epodi, 1882.
 Nuove odi barbare, 1882.
 Rime nuove, 1887.
 Terze odi barbare, 1889.
 Delle Odi barbare. Libri II ordinati e corretti, 1893.
 Rime e ritmi, 1899.
 Poesie. MDCCCL-MCM, 1901.

Below are the poetic volumes in the Opere. The volumes, however, do not correspond to the chronological order with which the poet had published his first collections, but refer more than anything else to the distinctions of genres and therefore we find poems of the same period in different collections. The collections follow this order:

 Juvenilia, in six books, 1850-1860
 Levia Gravia, in two books, 1861-1871
 Inno a Satana, 1863
 Giambi ed Epodi, in two books, 1867-1879
 Intermezzo, 1874-1887
 Rime Nuove, in nine books, 1861-1887
 Odi barbare, in two books, 1873-1889
 Rime e Ritmi, 1889-1898
 Della Canzone di Legnano, Part I, 1879

Juvenilia 
The first collection of lyrical poems, which Carducci collected and divided in six books under the title Juvenilia (1850-1860), is undoubtedly inspired by the classical tradition of the Amici pedanti group that was constituted at that time for the purpose of fighting the romanticism of the Florentines. In the verses of the collection we can immediately see his imitation of the ancient classics, of the stilnovo style, of Dante and Petrarch and, among the moderns, Vittorio Alfieri, Monti, Foscolo and Leopardi.

But the Carduccian spirit is already visible; his love for the beauty of style, the purity of sentiments and the celebration of liberty, as well as the ability to appreciate all that is genuine, therefore also the language of the common people.

See also
 Jessie White Mario

Notes

References
Nobel Prize Presentation Speech
Carducci Essentials: the Poems of Giosuè Carducci Translated in English,  LiteraryJoint Press, 2021

External links

 
 List of works
 
 
 
 Carducci: all the poems
 Carducci poems Original Italian text

1835 births
1907 deaths
Burials at Certosa cemetery
People from Pietrasanta
19th-century Italian poets
Italian male poets
Nobel laureates in Literature
Italian Nobel laureates
University of Pisa alumni
19th-century Italian male writers
19th-century atheists
20th-century atheists
Translators of Homer
Italian Freemasons